Micronutrients  are essential dietary elements required by organisms in varying quantities throughout life to orchestrate a range of physiological functions to maintain health. Micronutrient requirements differ between organisms; for example, humans and other animals require numerous vitamins and dietary minerals, whereas plants require specific minerals. For human nutrition, micronutrient requirements are in amounts generally less than 100 milligrams per day, whereas macronutrients are required in gram quantities daily.

The minerals for humans and other animals include 13 elements that originate from Earth's soil and are not synthesized by living organisms, such as calcium and iron. Micronutrient requirements for animals also include vitamins, which are organic compounds required in microgram or milligram amounts. Since plants are the primary origin of nutrients for humans and animals, some micronutrients may be in low levels and deficiencies can occur when dietary intake is insufficient, as occurs in malnutrition.

A multiple micronutrient powder of at least iron, zinc, and vitamin A was added to the World Health Organization's List of Essential Medicines in 2019.

Humans
At the 1990 World Summit for Children, the gathered nations identified deficiencies in two microminerals and one micronutrient – iodine, iron, and vitamin A – as being particularly common and posing public health risks in developing countries. The Summit set goals for elimination of these deficiencies. The Ottawa-based Micronutrient Initiative was formed in response to this challenge with the mission to undertake research and fund and implement micronutrient programming.

As programming around these micronutrients grew, new research in the 1990s led to the implementation of folate and zinc supplementation programs as well.

Priority programs include supplementation with vitamin A for children 6–59 months, zinc supplementation as a treatment for diarrhoeal disease, iron and folate supplementation for women of child-bearing age, salt iodization, staple food fortification, multiple micronutrient powders, biofortification of crops and behavior-centered nutrition education.

There is low-quality evidence that food fortifications with micronutrients may reduce the risk of getting anemia and micronutrient deficiency but there is an uncertain effect on the height and weight of children. Meanwhile, there is no data to show adverse effects of micronutrients fortification. Fortification of maize flour with iron and other vitamins and minerals has uncertain benefits on reducing the risk of anemia.

Deficiencies

Health impacts information summaries

Some scientific reviews provide overviews about the current scientific evidence about large sets of micronutrients and/or dietary supplements. One review about cardiovascular health effects provides a heat map that visualizes both evidence quality and health impact direction of each.
Some reviews only summarize information in the form of text. One review concluded that micronutrients "with the strongest evidence for immune support are vitamins C and D and zinc" and highlighted where further or better research is likely needed such as "[b]etter design of human clinical studies addressing dosage and combinations of micronutrients in different populations" to substantiate "the benefits of micronutrient supplementation against infection".

Salt iodization
Salt iodization is the recommended strategy for ensuring adequate human iodine intake. To iodize salt, potassium iodate is added to salt after it is refined and dried and before it is packed. Although large-scale iodization is most efficient, given the proliferation of small-scale salt producers in developing countries, technology for small-scale iodization has also been developed. International organizations work with national governments to identify and support small salt producers in adopting iodization activity.

In 1990, less than 20 percent of households in developing countries were consuming iodized salt. By 1994, international partnerships had formed in a global campaign for Universal Salt Iodization. By 2008, it was estimated that 72 percent of households in developing countries were consuming iodized salt and the number of countries in which iodine deficiency disorders were a public health concern reduced by more than half from 110 to 47 countries.

Vitamin A supplementation
In 1997, national vitamin A supplementation programming received a boost when experts met to discuss rapid scale-up of supplementation activity, and the Micronutrient Initiative, with support from the Government of Canada, began to ensure supply to UNICEF.

In areas with vitamin A deficiency, it is recommended that children aged 6–59 months receive two doses annually. In many countries, vitamin A supplementation is combined with immunization and campaign-style health events.

Global vitamin A supplementation efforts have targeted 103 priority countries. In 1999, 16 percent of children in these countries received two annual doses of vitamin A. By 2007, the rate increased to 62 percent.

The Micronutrient Initiative, with funding from the Government of Canada, supplies 75 percent of the vitamin A required for supplementation in developing countries.

Fortification of staple foods with Vitamin A has uncertain benefits on reducing the risk of subclinical Vitamin A deficiency.

Double-fortified salt
Double-fortified salt (DFS) is a public health tool for delivering nutritional iron. DFS is fortified with both iodine and iron. It was developed by Venkatesh Mannar, Executive Director of the Micronutrient Initiative and University of Toronto Professor Levente Diosady, who discovered a process for coating iron particles with a vegetable fat to prevent the negative interaction of iodine and iron.

In India, Tata Salt Plus is an iodine-plus-iron fortified salt, developed by the National Institute of Nutrition, Hyderabad through double fortification technology. This technology was offered to Tata Chemicals under a long-term MoU after due studies on bio-availability across the population strata conducted and published by NIN.

It was first used in public programming in 2004. In September 2010 DFS was produced in the Indian state of Tamil Nadu and distributed through a state school feeding program. DFS has also been used to combat iron deficiency anemia (IDA) in the Indian state of Bihar. In September 2010, Venkatesh Mannar was named a Laureat of the California-based Tech Awards for his work in developing Double-Fortified Salt.

Micro-enriched fertilization
The returns of applying micronutrient-enriched fertilizers could be huge for human health, social and economic development. Research has shown that enriching fertilizers with micronutrients had not only an impact on plant deficiencies but also on humans and animals, through the food chain. A 1994 report by the World Bank estimated that micronutrient malnutrition costs developing economies at least 5 percent of gross domestic product. The Asian Development Bank has summarized the benefits of eliminating micronutrient deficiencies as follows:

Along with a growing understanding of the extent and impact of micronutrient malnutrition, several interventions have demonstrated the feasibility and benefits of correction and prevention. Distributing inexpensive capsules, diversifying to include more micronutrient-rich foods, or fortifying commonly consumed foods can make an enormous difference. Correcting iodine, vitamin A, and iron deficiencies can improve the population-wide intelligence quotient by 10-15 points, reduce maternal deaths by one-fourth, decrease infant and child mortality by 40 percent, and increase people's work capacity by almost half. The elimination of these deficiencies will reduce health care and education costs, improve work capacity and productivity, and accelerate equitable economic
growth and national development. Improved nutrition is essential to sustain economic growth. Micronutrient deficiency elimination is as cost-effective as the best public health interventions and fortification is the most cost-effective strategy.

Zinc
Fortification of staple foods with zinc exclusively may improve serum zinc levels in the population. Other effects such as improving zinc deficiency, children's growth, cognition, work capacity of adults, or blood indicators are unknown. Experiments show that soil and foliar application of zinc fertilizer can effectively reduce the phytate zinc ratio in grain. People who eat bread prepared from zinc enriched wheat show a significant increase in serum zinc, suggesting that the zinc fertilizer strategy is a promising approach to address zinc deficiencies in humans.

Where zinc deficiency is a limiting factor, zinc fertilization can increase crop yields. Balanced crop nutrition supplying all essential nutrients, including zinc, is a cost-effective management strategy. Even with zinc-efficient varieties, zinc fertilizers are needed when the available zinc in the topsoil becomes depleted.

Plants

There are about seven nutrients essential to plant growth and health that are only needed in very small quantities. Though these are present in only small quantities, they are all necessary:

Boron is believed to be involved in carbohydrate transport in plants; it also assists in metabolic regulation. Boron deficiency will often result in bud dieback.
Chlorine is necessary for osmosis and ionic balance; it also plays a role in photosynthesis.
Copper is a component of some enzymes. Symptoms of copper deficiency include browning of leaf tips and chlorosis.
Iron is essential for chlorophyll synthesis, which is why an iron deficiency results in chlorosis.
Manganese activates some important enzymes involved in chlorophyll formation. Manganese deficient plants will develop chlorosis between the veins of its leaves. The availability of manganese is partially dependent on soil pH.
Molybdenum is essential to plant health. Molybdenum is used by plants to reduce nitrates into usable forms. Some plants use it for nitrogen fixation, thus it may need to be added to some soils before seeding legumes.
Zinc  participates in chlorophyll formation, and also activates many enzymes. Symptoms of zinc deficiency include chlorosis and stunted growth.

Crop biofortification
Biofortification of crop plants – improvement of vitamin and mineral levels through plant biotechnology – is being used in many world regions to address micronutrient deficiencies in regions of poverty and malnutrition. Golden rice is a genetically modified rice that has been fortified with beta-carotene, specifically with the purpose of supplying countries with Vitamin A deficiencies such as those of the African continent.

See also

 List of micronutrients
 Human nutrition
 Macronutrient (ecology)
 Dietary mineral (redirects to Mineral (nutrient))
 Silicon ´Human nutrition´
 Manganese deficiency (medicine)
 John Mortvedt, soil scientist focused on micronutrient fertilizer
 Healing clay (Medicinal clay)

References

External links

 Micronutrient Information Center, Oregon State University

Nutrition